Elections were held in the Australian state of Victoria on Saturday 2 June 1928 to elect 17 of the 34 members of the state's Legislative Council. MLCs were elected using preferential voting.

Results

Legislative Council

|}

Retiring Members
Joseph Sternberg MLC (Nationalist, Bendigo) had resigned some months prior to the election, but no by-election had been held.

Nationalist
Theodore Beggs MLC (Nelson)
James Merritt MLC (East Yarra)
Thomas Payne MLC (Melbourne South)

Country Progressive
William Crockett MLC (North Western)

Candidates
Sitting members are shown in bold text. Successful candidates are highlighted in the relevant colour. Where there is possible confusion, an asterisk (*) is also used.

See also
1929 Victorian state election

References

1928 elections in Australia
Elections in Victoria (Australia)
1920s in Victoria (Australia)
June 1928 events